Jørgen Barth-Jørgensen (15 February 1932 – 6 December 2021) was a Norwegian weightlifter. He competed in the men's middle heavyweight event at the 1952 Summer Olympics. From 1952 to 1958 he was Norwegian champion in the 90 kg category without interruption.

References

External links
 

1932 births
2021 deaths
Norwegian male weightlifters
Olympic weightlifters of Norway
Weightlifters at the 1952 Summer Olympics
People from Larvik
Sportspeople from Vestfold og Telemark
20th-century Norwegian people